Yousef Seyyedi (born March 8, 1996) is an Iranian Football winger who currently plays for Machine Sazi in the Persian Gulf Pro League.

Club career

Early years
Seyedi started his career with Zob Ahan Ardabil from youth levels.

Gostaresh Foolad
He joined Gostaresh Foolad in November 2013. He made his debut for Gostaresh Foolad on October 31, 2014 against Tractor as a substitute for Meysam Naghizadeh.

Club career statistics

International career

U17
He was part of Iran U–17 in 2012 AFC U-16 Championship and 2013 FIFA U-17 World Cup.

U20
He invited to Iran U–20 by Ali Dousti Mehr to preparation for 2014 AFC U-19 Championship.

References

External links
 Yousef Seyedi at IranLeague.ir

1996 births
Living people
Iranian footballers
Gostaresh Foulad F.C. players
People from Ardabil
Iran under-20 international footballers
Association football forwards
Machine Sazi F.C. players